Women's tournament for field hockey at the 2018 Asian Games was held at the Gelora Bung Karno Hockey Field, Jakarta, Indonesia from 19 to 31 August 2018.

Competition schedule

Qualification

Squads

Pools composition
Teams were seeded following the serpentine system according to their FIH World Ranking as of December 2017.

Preliminary round
All times are local (UTC+7).

Pool A

Pool B

Final round

Classification round

Ninth place game

Seventh place game

Fifth place game

Medal round

Semifinals

Bronze medal game

Gold medal game

Final ranking
Qualification for 2020 Summer Olympics

 – Japan qualified both as host and continental champion, therefore that quota is added to the qualification events rather than going to the runner-up of the tournament.

Statistics

Goalscorers

See also
Field hockey at the 2018 Asian Games – Men's tournament

References

External links

 
2018
Women
Asian Games
2018 Asian Games
Asian Games
2018